Kiel McClung (born May 1, 1985 in Fresno, California) is an American former soccer player.

Career

Youth and College
McClung was a three-time letterwinner at Quartz Hill High School under coach Tony Bruce. McClung was named the Golden League’s Most Valuable Player as a Junior, Daily News Player of the Year, and also the CIF Division 1 Offensive Player of the Year. McClung was also named an NSCAA/Adidas All-American.

McClung played soccer at the University of California, Los Angeles where he obtained his Bachelor of Arts in Sociology. McClung played 72 games in his four years at UCLA, and started in 56. His freshman year he was selected to the College Soccer News All-Freshman selection. That summer, McClung received 10 caps with the US U-20 national team. Senior year, McClung was named captain and led his team to the 2006 NCAA National Final. In 2005, McClung debuted in PDL for the Southern California Seahorses. During 2006, McClung was on the roster of the San Fernando Valley Quakes team in the USL Premier Development League, but did not feature in any games due to injury.

Professional
In January 2007, McClung was drafted as the 44th overall in the MLS Supplemental Draft by the Los Angeles Galaxy. He trained with the team for several months before signing a contract with California Victory. McClung was named the Victory's first ever player of the week with goals against Necaxa FC and Rochester Rhinos. McClung is one of few members in the Antelope Valley Sports Hall of Fame.

McClung joined the Cleveland City Stars on a mid-season contract in 2008, and helped the City Stars win the USL Second Division championship.

Other Roles
McClung is currently a director at California Athletic Soccer Club. He is the coach of the Boys 2005 Red Team.

References

External links
Player Profile at the UCLA Soccer website
Player Profile at the California Victory website
The AVSports website Hall of Fame

1985 births
American soccer players
Sportspeople from Los Angeles County, California
Living people
USL First Division players
California Victory players
UCLA Bruins men's soccer players
San Fernando Valley Quakes players
Southern California Seahorses players
USL Second Division players
Cleveland City Stars players
USL League Two players
LA Galaxy draft picks
United States men's under-20 international soccer players
Soccer players from California
Association football defenders
People from Palmdale, California